The Mamba North East gas field is a natural gas field located offshore the Cabo Delgado Province. It was discovered in 2012 and developed by and Eni. It began production in 2012 and produces natural gas and condensates. The total proven reserves of the Mamba North East gas field are around 10 trillion cubic feet (286×109m³), and production is slated to be around 100 million cubic feet/day (2.9×105m³).

References

Natural gas fields in Mozambique